Stubøprisen (an Award initiated in 1989, in memory of the late guitar virtuoso and Northern Norway Enthusiast Thorgeir Stubø) is the highest honor given to a Northern Norwegian jazz musician. The award is given every second year to a person who makes or has made a special contribution to the Northern Norwegian Jazz Scene by the Thorgeir Stubø Memorial Fund (established 1987). The idea behind Thorgeir Stubø Memorial Fund is to honor a great jazz musician and simultaneously stimulate Northern Norwegian culture. The Stubøprisen Winners is awarded a grant of NKR 15 000 (2011) and a statuette created by the artist and sculptor Karl Erik Harr.

Recipients of Stubøprisen 
1989: Kjell Bartholdsen (saxophone) from Hammerfest
1991: Henning Gravrok from Bodø, 1 (saxophone)
1993: Marit Sandvik from Tromsø, 1993 (vocals)
1995: Øystein Norvoll from Tromsø, 1995 (guitar)
1997: Jan Gunnar Hoff from Bodø, 1997 (piano)
1999: Trond Sverre Hansen from Narvik (drums)
2001: Konrad Kaspersen from Tromsø, 1 (double bass)
2003: Øystein B. Blix from Tromsø (trombone)
2005: Tore Johansen from Bodø (trumpet)
2007: Hallgeir Pedersen from Øksfjord, 2007 (guitar)
2009: Finn Sletten from Bodø (drums)
2011: Jan Ditlev Hansen from Tromsø, 2011 (Music Journalist and author)
2013: Tim Chalman (saxophone & flute) from Texas, U.S.
2015: Oddmund Finnseth (double bass) from Sortland.

References

External links
Stubøprisen til Jan Ditlev on NRK

Culture in Nordland
Norwegian music awards
Norwegian jazz
Awards established in 1989